Novorossiysk (Novorossiysk Urban Okrug) is a city in Krasnodar Krai, Russia, founded 1838.

Novorossiysk may also refer to:
Port of Novorossiysk, one of the largest sea ports in Russia
Novorossiysk Commercial Sea Port, Russia's largest commercial sea port operator
Soviet aircraft carrier Novorossiysk
Russian submarine Novorossiysk
Dnipro, a city in Ukraine that was named Novorossiysk from 1797 to 1802
Novorossiya Governorate, or Novorossiysk Governorate, of the Russian Empire, 1764–83, and 1796–1802
Novorossiysk, name of the Italian battleship Giulio Cesare given to it by the Soviets after it had served in both World Wars and then joined the Soviet Navy

See also
Novorossiya
New Russia (disambiguation)